HMAS Perth (FFH 157) is an Anzac-class frigate of the Royal Australian Navy (RAN). The last ship of the class to be completed, she was built by Tenix Defence and commissioned into the RAN in 2006. In 2007, Perth became the first major warship of the RAN to be commanded by a woman. During 2010 and 2011, the frigate was used as the testbed for a major upgrade to the Anzac class' ability to defend themselves from anti-ship missiles.

Design and construction

The Anzac class originated from RAN plans to replace the six River-class destroyer escorts with a mid-capability patrol frigate. The Australian shipbuilding industry was thought to be incapable of warship design, so the RAN decided to take a proven foreign design and modify it. Around the same time, the Royal New Zealand Navy (RNZN) was looking to replace four Leander-class frigates; a deterioration in New Zealand-United States relations, the need to improve alliances with nearby nations, and the commonalities between the RAN and RNZN ships' requirements led the two nations to begin collaborating on the acquisition in 1987. Tenders were requested by the Anzac Ship Project at the end of 1986, with 12 ship designs (including an airship) submitted. By August 1987, the tenders were narrowed down in October to Blohm + Voss's MEKO 200 design, the M class (later Karel Doorman class) offered by Royal Schelde, and a scaled-down Type 23 frigate proposed by Yarrow Shipbuilders. In 1989, the Australian government announced that Melbourne-based shipbuilder AMECON (which became Tenix Defence) would build the modified MEKO 200 design. The Australians ordered eight ships, while New Zealand ordered two, with an unexercised option for two more.

The Anzacs are based on Blohm + Voss' MEKO 200 PN (or Vasco da Gama class) frigates, modified to meet Australian and New Zealand specifications and maximise the use of locally built equipment. Each frigate has a  full load displacement. A Combined Diesel or Gas (CODOG) propulsion machinery layout is used, with a single,  General Electric LM2500-30 gas turbine and two  MTU 12V1163 TB83 diesel engines driving the ship's two controllable-pitch propellers.

As designed, the main armament for the frigate is a 5-inch 54 calibre Mark 45 gun, supplemented by an eight-cell Mark 41 vertical launch system (for RIM-7 Sea Sparrow or RIM-162 Evolved Sea Sparrow missiles), two  machine guns, and two Mark 32 triple torpedo tube sets (initially firing Mark 46 torpedoes, but later upgraded to use the MU90 Impact torpedo). They were also designed for but not with a close-in weapons system (two Mini Typhoons fitted when required from 2005 onwards), two quad-canister Harpoon anti-ship missile launchers (which were installed across the RAN vessels from 2005 onwards), and a second Mark 41 launcher (which has not been added). The Australian Anzacs use a Sikorsky S-70B-2 Seahawk helicopter; plans to replace them with Kaman SH-2G Super Seasprites were cancelled in 2008 due to ongoing problems.

Perth was laid down at Williamstown, Victoria, on 24 July 2003. The ship was assembled from six hull modules and six superstructure modules; the superstructure modules were fabricated in Whangarei, New Zealand, and hull modules were built at both Williamstown and Newcastle, New South Wales, with final integration at Williamstown. She was launched on 20 March 2004, and commissioned into the RAN on 26 August 2006 in Fremantle, Western Australia (the closest port to the ship's namesake city). Perth was the final Anzac-class ship to be constructed.

Operational history
In mid-2007, Commander Michele Miller became the first woman to command a major RAN warship when she assumed command of Perth.

On 18 January 2010, Perth docked at the Australian Marine Complex in Henderson, Western Australia to be modified under the Anti-Ship Missile Defence Project. The upgrade, intended to improve the class' anti-ship self-defence capability, included the fitting of CEA Technologies' CEAFAR and CEAMOUNT phased array radars, a Vampir NG Infrared Search and Track system, and Sharpeye Navigational Radar Systems, along with improvements to the operations room equipment and layout. Because of the added equipment, additional ballast was added to improve the frigate's stability, and the ship's quarterdeck was enclosed. The additional weight brought the ship's full load displacement to 3,810 tons. On 27 April, the frigate sailed to the east coast of Australia to continue trials, with further testing to occur at the United States Navy's Pacific Missile Range Facility, then during Exercise Talisman Sabre. Testing was completed by July 2011, and the rollout of the ASMD upgrade across the class was approved in November 2011.

In October 2013, Perth participated in the International Fleet Review 2013 in Sydney.

During February and March 2015, an MH-60R Seahawk Romeo helicopter from 725 Squadron RAN was embarked aboard Perth for at-sea trials of the new helicopter.

In June 2016  Perth was deployed to the Middle East Region on Operation Manitou as part of the coalition taskforce to stop criminal activities such as piracy and drug trafficking. Perth was the Royal Australian Navy's 63rd ship rotation since 1991.

In 2017 the Navy decided to place Perth in 'extended readiness' from December that year as it was unable to crew the vessel. From late 2018, Perth underwent the Anzac-class frigate Midlife Capability Assurance Program (AMCAP) upgrade at the Australian Marine Complex, Henderson, Western Australia. In 2019 it was reported that Perth would not re-enter service until 2021 as the Navy still did not have enough sailors to form a crew.

Citations

References
Books

 The chapter is available separately as Semaphore, Issue 19, 2006 in PDF and HTML formats.

Journal articles

News articles

Press releases

External links

Anzac-class frigates of the Royal Australian Navy
Naval ships of Australia
2004 ships
Military Units in Western Australia